Andrzej Aleksander Możejko (22 April 1949 – 1 May 2021) was a Polish professional footballer who played as a defender. He won two league championships with Widzew Łódź and also played for Kokkolan Palloveikot and Rauman Pallo in Finland.

References

1949 births
2021 deaths
Polish footballers
Association football defenders
Ekstraklasa players
Widzew Łódź players
Kokkolan Palloveikot players
Rauman Pallo footballers
Polish expatriate footballers
Polish expatriate sportspeople in Finland
Expatriate footballers in Finland